Harriet Andreassen (6 May 1925 – 10 February 1997) was a Norwegian labour activist and politician for the Labour Party. Born in Vikna, she was secretary of the union Norsk Arbeidsmandsforbund (Union of Norwegian Working Men) from 1967 to 1977, and of the Norwegian Confederation of Trade Unions (LO) from 1977 to 1985. On 3 October 1980, upon the resignation of Inger Louise Valle, she was appointed Minister of Local Government in the government of Odvar Nordli (1976–1981), and remained in this position throughout the short-lived first government of Gro Harlem Brundtland in 1981.

References 

1925 births
1997 deaths
Ministers of Local Government and Modernisation of Norway
Labour Party (Norway) politicians
People from Vikna